This was the first edition of the event. Chris Guccione and André Sá won the title when Raven Klaasen and Rajeev Ram withdrew from the final.

Seeds

Draw

Draw

References
 Main Draw

Aegon Manchester Trophy - Doubles
2015 Doubles